Metarctia heinrichi is a moth of the subfamily Arctiinae. It was described by Sergius G. Kiriakoff in 1961. It is found in Angola.

References

 

Endemic fauna of Angola
Metarctia
Moths described in 1961